The year 1672 in science and technology involved some significant events.

Astronomy
 February 6 – Isaac Newton submits his first paper on optics to the Royal Society of London.
 December 23 – Giovanni Cassini discovers Rhea, a satellite of Saturn.
 John Flamsteed determines the solar parallax from observations of Mars.

Botany
 Robert Morison publishes Plantarum Umbelliferarum Distributio Nova, per Tabulas Cognationis et Affinitatis, ex Libra Naturae observata et detecta, the first monograph devoted to a specific group of plants, the Umbelliferae.

Mathematics
 Georg Mohr publishes the Mohr–Mascheroni theorem, that any geometric construction that can be performed by a compass and straightedge can be performed by a compass alone.

Medicine
 Paul Barbette publishes Opera omnia medica et chirurgica.
 Richard Lower publishes De Catarrhis, the first scholarly attempt by an English physician to take a classical doctrine (the theory that nasal catarrh is caused by secretions overspilling from the brain) and to disprove it by scientific experiment.
 Dutch physician Regnier de Graaf describes the female reproductive system.
 Isbrand van Diemerbroeck publishes the first edition of his Anatome corporis humani in Utrecht.
 Thomas Willis publishes the earliest English work on medical psychology, Two Discourses concerning The Soul of Brutes, Which is that of the Vital and Sensitive of Man.

Technology
 Dutch painter Jan van der Heyden improves the fire hose, with his brother Nicolaes, a hydraulic engineer.

Institutions
 January 11 – Isaac Newton is elected a Fellow of the Royal Society of London and it then demonstrates his reflecting telescope to King Charles II of England.

Births
 February 13 – Étienne François Geoffroy, French chemist (died 1731)
 August 2 – Johann Jakob Scheuchzer, Swiss natural historian (died 1733)
 Ann Baynard, English natural philosopher  (died 1697)

Deaths
 March – Peter Blondeau, French-born pioneer of mechanised minting of coin
 April 26 – Lionel Lockyer, English quack doctor (born c. 1600)
 July 3 – Francis Willughby, English ornithologist and ichthyologist, pleurisy (born 1635)
 November 19 – John Wilkins, English bishop and natural philosopher, co-founder of the Royal Society (born 1614)
 late – Semyon Dezhnev, Pomor navigator who in 1648 made the first recorded voyage through the Bering Strait (born c. 1605)

References

 
17th century in science
1670s in science